Im Hui-sik (born 24 February 1968) is a South Korean archer. He competed in the men's individual and team events at the 1992 Summer Olympics.

References

External links
 

1968 births
Living people
South Korean male archers
Olympic archers of South Korea
Archers at the 1992 Summer Olympics
Place of birth missing (living people)
20th-century South Korean people